Litoria mucro is a species of frog in the subfamily Pelodryadinae, endemic to Papua New Guinea.
Its natural habitats are subtropical or tropical moist lowland forests and swamps.

References

Litoria
Amphibians of Papua New Guinea
Amphibians described in 1993
Taxonomy articles created by Polbot